As of September 2016, the International Union for Conservation of Nature (IUCN) lists 402 near threatened amphibian species. 6.2% of all evaluated amphibian species are listed as near threatened. 
No subpopulations of amphibians have been evaluated by the IUCN.

This is a complete list of near threatened amphibian species evaluated by the IUCN.

Salamanders
There are 62 salamander species assessed as near threatened.

Lungless salamanders

Salamandrids

Other salamander species

Frogs
There are 340 frog species assessed as near threatened.

Robber frogs

Shrub frogs

True toads

Fleshbelly frogs

Glass frogs

Litter frogs

Screeching frogs

Hemiphractids

Cycloramphids

Poison dart frogs

Mantellids

Fork-tongued frogs

Narrow-mouthed frogs

True frogs

Puddle frogs

Hylids

African reed frogs

Pyxicephalids

Other frog species

See also 
 Lists of IUCN Red List near threatened species
 List of least concern amphibians
 List of vulnerable amphibians
 List of endangered amphibians
 List of critically endangered amphibians
 List of recently extinct amphibians
 List of data deficient amphibians

References 

Amphibians
Near threatened amphibians
Near threatened amphibians